In sociology, an isomorphism is a similarity of the processes or structure of one organization to those of another, be it the result of imitation or independent development under similar constraints. There are three main types of institutional isomorphism: normative, coercive and mimetic. The development that these three types of isomorphism can also create isomorphic paradoxes that hinder such development. Specifically, these isomorphic paradoxes are related to an organization's remit, resources, accountability, and professionalization.

The concept of institutional isomorphism was primarily developed by Paul DiMaggio and Walter Powell.
The concept appears in their classical paper The iron cage revisited: institutional isomorphism and collective rationality in organizational fields from 1983.

Isomorphism in the context of globalization, is an idea of contemporary national societies that is addressed by the institutionalization of world models constructed and propagated through global cultural and associational processes. As it is emphasized by realist theories the heterogeneity of economic and political resource or local cultural origins by the micro-phenomenological theories, many ideas suggest that the trajectory of change in political units is towards homogenization around the world.

Such similarities so called isomorphic changes are found by researchers, explaining, despite of all possible configurations of local economic forces, power relationships, and forms of traditional culture it might consist of, a previously isolated island society that made contact with the rest of the globe would quickly take on standardized forms and appear to be similar to a hundred other nation-states around the world. Isomorphic developments of same conclusion are reported from nay nation-states' features, that is, constitutional forms highlighting both state power and individual rights, mass schooling systems organized around a fairly standard curriculum, rationalized economic and demographic record keeping and data systems, antinatalist population control policies intended to enhance national development, formally equalized female status and rights, expanded human rights in general, expansive environmental policies, development-oriented economic policy, universalistic welfare systems, standard definitions of disease and health care, and even some basic demographic variables. These isomorphisms are difficultly accounted by theories reasoning from the differences among national economies and cultural traditions, however, they are sensible outcomes if nation-states are enactments of the world cultural order.

See also
 Coercive isomorphism
 Mimetic isomorphism
 New institutionalism
 Normative isomorphism

References

Sociological terminology